Ronald Dion DeSantis (born September 14, 1978) is an American politician, attorney, and former military officer serving since 2019 as the 46th governor of Florida. A member of the Republican Party, DeSantis represented  in the U.S. House of Representatives from 2013 to 2018.

Born in Jacksonville, DeSantis spent most of his childhood in Dunedin, Florida. He graduated from Yale University and Harvard Law School. DeSantis joined the United States Navy in 2004 and was promoted to lieutenant before serving as a legal advisor to SEAL Team One. He was stationed at Joint Task Force Guantanamo in 2006, and was deployed to Iraq in 2007. When he returned to the U.S. a year later, the U.S. Department of Justice appointed DeSantis to serve as a Special Assistant U.S. attorney at the U.S. Attorney's Office in the Middle District of Florida, a position he held until his honorable discharge from active military duty in 2010.

DeSantis was first elected to Congress in 2012, defeating his Democratic opponent Heather Beaven. During his tenure he became a founding member of the Freedom Caucus and was an ally of President Donald Trump. DeSantis frequently criticized the Mueller investigation, led by Special Counsel Robert Mueller, into allegations of "links and/or coordination" between the Trump campaign and Russian interference in the 2016 U.S. presidential election. He briefly ran for U.S. Senate in 2016, but withdrew when incumbent senator Marco Rubio sought reelection. DeSantis won the Republican nomination for the 2018 gubernatorial election and chose state representative Jeanette Nuñez as his running mate; in the general election, he defeated the Democratic nominee, Tallahassee mayor Andrew Gillum, by 0.4%.

As governor, DeSantis resisted taking measures to slow the spread of COVID-19 that other state governments implemented, such as face mask mandates, stay-at-home orders, and vaccination requirements. In May 2021, he signed into law a bill that prohibited businesses, schools, cruise ships, and government entities from requiring proof of vaccination. DeSantis cut spending in Florida, which, combined with federal stimulus payments and increasing sales tax revenue in 2021-22, led to a record state budget surplus. He engaged in recovery efforts after Hurricane Ian and Hurricane Nicole. He was reelected in a landslide victory over Charlie Crist in the 2022 Florida gubernatorial election; his 19.4% margin of victory was the state's largest in 40 years.

Early life and education 
DeSantis was born on September 14, 1978, in Jacksonville, the son of Karen DeSantis (née Rogers; her family name was originally Ruggiero before her father, Philip Ernest Rogers/Ruggiero changed it) and Ronald Daniel DeSantis. On his mother's side, he is descended from Campanian, Molisan and Abruzzese great-grandparents who immigrated from Italy to the U.S. 

He is Italian American, a descendant of Italians who emigrated from Italy to the U.S. during the Italian diaspora. All of his great-grandparents were born in Italy, and they were originally from comuni in the provinces of L'Aquila (Bugnara, Cansano, Pacentro and Pratola Peligna, in Abruzzo region), Caserta (Caserta, in Campania region), Avellino (Castelfranci, in Campania region) and Campobasso (Castelbottaccio, in Molise region). 

DeSantis's paternal grandfather was Daniel DeSantis, born in Beaver, Pennsylvania, to Italian parents who immigrated to the U.S., Nicola DeSantis and Maria Nolfi, who were born in Cansano, province of L'Aquila, in Abruzzo region, Southern Italy. His maternal great-great-grandfather, Salvatore Storti, immigrated to the U.S. from Italy in 1904, eventually settling in Pennsylvania. His great-great-grandmother Luigia Colucci joined her husband in the U.S. in 1917.

DeSantis's mother was a nurse and his father installed Nielsen TV rating boxes. His parents met while attending Youngstown State University in Youngstown, Ohio, during the 1970s and moved to Florida during that decade. His family moved to Orlando, Florida, before relocating to Dunedin, Florida, when he was six years old. His sister Christina Marie DeSantis was born on May 5, 1985, in Orlando and died in 2015 at age 30. He was a member of the Little League team from Dunedin National that made it to the 1991 Little League World Series in Williamsport, Pennsylvania. DeSantis attended Our Lady of Lourdes Catholic School and Dunedin High School, graduating in 1997.

After high school, DeSantis studied history at Yale University. He was captain of Yale's varsity baseball team and joined the Delta Kappa Epsilon fraternity. He was an outfielder on the Yale baseball team; as a senior in 2001, he had the team's best batting average at .336. While attending Yale he worked a variety of jobs, including as an electrician's assistant and a coach at a baseball camp. DeSantis graduated from Yale in 2001 with a B.A. magna cum laude.

After Yale, he taught history and coached for a year at Darlington School in Georgia. He subsequently attended Harvard Law School, graduating in 2005 with a Juris Doctor cum laude.

Military service
In 2004, during his second year at Harvard Law, DeSantis was commissioned as an officer in the U.S. Navy and assigned to the Navy Judge Advocate General's Corps (JAG). He completed Naval Justice School in 2005. Later that year, he reported to the JAG Trial Service Office Command South East at Naval Station Mayport, Florida, as a prosecutor. He was promoted from lieutenant, junior grade to lieutenant in 2006. He was then stationed at Joint Task Force Guantanamo (JTF-GTMO), working directly with detainees at the Guantanamo Bay detention camp.  The records of DeSantis's service in the Navy were often redacted upon release to the public, to protect personal privacy, according to the Navy. Mansur Ahmad Saad al-Dayfi, who was held at Guantanamo, alleged that DeSantis oversaw force-feedings of detainees.

In 2007, DeSantis reported to the Naval Special Warfare Command Group in Coronado, California, where he was assigned to SEAL Team One and deployed to Iraq with the troop surge as the legal advisor to the SEAL Commander of the Special Operations Task Force-West in Fallujah.

DeSantis returned to the U.S. in April 2008, at which time he was reassigned to the Naval Region Southeast Legal Service. The U.S. Department of Justice appointed him to serve as a Special Assistant U.S. attorney at the U.S. Attorney's Office in the Middle District of Florida. DeSantis was assigned as a trial defense counsel until his honorable discharge from active duty in February 2010. He concurrently accepted a reserve commission as a lieutenant in the Judge Advocate General's Corps of the US Navy Reserve.

During his military career, DeSantis has been awarded the Bronze Star Medal, the Navy and Marine Corps Commendation Medal, the Global War on Terrorism Service Medal, and the Iraq Campaign Medal.

DeSantis was still serving in the U.S. Navy Reserve as of his transition to the governorship. His membership in the Navy ended in 2019, shortly after his gubernatorial inauguration.

U.S. House of Representatives

2012 election

In 2012, DeSantis announced he would run in the Republican primary for Florida's 6th congressional district. The district had previously been part of the 7th, represented by 10-term Republican John Mica, but Mica's share of Orlando had been drawn into the new 7th District, and Mica opted to run there.

DeSantis won the six-candidate Republican primary with 39% of the vote, while the runner-up, state representative Fred Costello, received 23%. In the November general election, DeSantis defeated Democratic nominee Heather Beaven 57–43%, with majorities in all four counties. He was reelected in 2014 and 2016.

Committee assignments

During the 114th United States Congress, DeSantis served on the Committee on Oversight and Accountability, and chaired its Subcommittee on National Security. He also served on the Foreign Affairs Committee, Judiciary Committee, and the Republican Study Committee, along with several subcommittees of those.

Legislation

 

DeSantis signed a 2013 pledge sponsored by Americans for Prosperity vowing to vote against any global warming legislation that would raise taxes. He introduced the Faithful Execution of the Law Act of 2014, which did not become law but would have required the United States Department of Justice to report to Congress whenever any federal agency refrains from enforcing laws for any reason. In 2015, DeSantis was a founding member of the Freedom Caucus, a group of congressional conservatives and libertarians.

In August 2017, DeSantis proposed legislation to end funding by November of that year for the Mueller investigation of President Trump. He said that the DOJ order dated May 17, 2017, "didn't identify a crime to be investigated" and was likely to start a fishing expedition. House Republican leaders did not allow DeSantis's amendment to proceed to the floor for a vote.

2016 U.S. Senate candidacy

In May 2015, DeSantis announced his candidacy for the United States Senate seat held by Marco Rubio, who initially did not file to run for reelection due to his bid for the U.S. presidency. He was endorsed by the fiscally conservative Club for Growth. When Rubio ended his presidential bid and ran for reelection to the Senate, DeSantis withdrew from the Senate race and ran for reelection to the House.

Gubernatorial elections

2018 

In January 2018, DeSantis announced his candidacy for governor of Florida to succeed term-limited Republican incumbent Rick Scott. President Trump had said in December 2017 that he would support DeSantis should he run for governor. During the Republican primary, DeSantis emphasized his support for Trump by running an ad in which DeSantis taught his children how to "build the wall" and say "Make America Great Again" and dressed one of his children in a red "Make America Great Again" jumper. Asked if he could name an issue where he disagreed with Trump, DeSantis did not identify one. On July 30, 2018, Jonathan Martin of The New York Times wrote that the support DeSantis's primary campaign had received demonstrated both Trump's king-making capacity in a Republican-trending state and a "broader nationalization of conservative politics" whereby "a willingness to hurl rhetorical lightning bolts at the left, the media and special counsel Robert S. Mueller can override local credentials, local endorsements and preparedness for a state-based job".

On August 28, 2018, DeSantis won the Republican primary by defeating his main opponent, Adam Putnam. His next opponent was Democratic nominee Andrew Gillum in the general election. The race was "widely seen as a toss-up".

In a televised interview on Fox News on the day of his primary win, DeSantis said, "The last thing we need to do is to monkey this up by trying to embrace a socialist agenda with huge tax increases and bankrupting the state." His use of the word "monkey" received widespread media attention, and was interpreted by some, including Florida Democratic Party Chair Terrie Rizzo, as a racist dog whistle.  DeSantis denied the racism charge. Dexter Filkins, writing in The New Yorker in 2022, called it a "disastrous gaffe", and quoted an unnamed ally of DeSantis lamenting that afterward, "We were handling Gillum with kid gloves. We can't hit the guy, because we're trying to defend the fact that we're not racist."

In September 2018, DeSantis announced state representative Jeanette Núñez as his running mate. He resigned his House seat on September 10, 2018, to focus on his gubernatorial campaign. The same month, DeSantis was criticized by television talk show host Joe Scarborough for not having a fully formed policy platform, and canceled a planned interview with the Tampa Bay Times to have additional time to put together a platform before an in-depth policy interview.

DeSantis was endorsed by the Florida Police Chiefs Association. In the campaign, some sheriffs endorsed DeSantis, while other sheriffs backed Gillum.

DeSantis's gubernatorial platform included support for legislation that would allow people with concealed weapons permits to carry firearms openly. He also supported a law mandating the use of E-Verify by businesses and a state-level ban on sanctuary city protections for undocumented immigrants. DeSantis promised to stop the spread of polluted water from Lake Okeechobee. He expressed support for a state constitutional amendment to require a supermajority vote for any tax increases. DeSantis opposed allowing able-bodied, childless adults to receive Medicaid. He said he would implement a medical cannabis program, while opposing the legalization of recreational cannabis.

Initial election-night results had DeSantis winning by nearly 100,000 votes, and Gillum conceded. Gillum rescinded his concession after late-counted ballots brought the race within less than 34,000 votes, a margin of 0.4%. The close margin required an automatic machine recount of the ballots.

A machine recount in three statewide contests (governor, U.S. senator, and agriculture commissioner) began with a November 15 deadline. Although three counties missed the deadline, it was not extended. DeSantis was confirmed as the winner and Gillum conceded on November 17.

2022 

In September 2021, DeSantis announced that he would run for reelection in 2022. The Democratic nominee was Charlie Crist, a former Florida governor and U.S. representative. Crist left the Republican Party in 2010 to become an independent, then joined the Democratic Party in 2012. Crist heavily criticized DeSantis's decision to deport illegal immigrants to Democratic states, arguing that it was human rights abuse. During an interview with Bret Baier on Fox News, Crist said that DeSantis was "one of the biggest threats to democracy".

The gubernatorial debate was held on October 23, and the candidates exchanged attacks. At one point, Crist asked DeSantis whether he would serve a full four-year term, in relation to talk about a potential DeSantis campaign for the presidency in the 2024 United States presidential election. DeSantis responded, "the only worn-out old donkey I'm looking to put out to pastures is Charlie Crist". DeSantis mentioned that Crist promised in his 2006 gubernatorial campaign that he would not raise taxes, but when elected signed a large increase in taxes and fees. He also criticized Crist's role in the U.S. House of Representatives, bringing up that during 2022, Crist showed up for work for only 14 days.

In the November 8 election, DeSantis won with 59.4% of the vote to Crist's 40%. Many news outlets called his win a "landslide". His margin of victory of over 1,500,000 votes was Florida's largest since 1982. He won Miami-Dade County, which had been a Democratic stronghold since 2002, and Palm Beach County, which had not voted Republican since 1986. Crist conceded the election shortly after DeSantis was projected to be the winner. At DeSantis's victory rally, supporters chanted "two more years" at various times rather than the common "four more years" to show support for DeSantis for president in 2024.

Tenure as governor
DeSantis prefiled the oath of office with the Florida secretary of state and became governor on January 8, 2019. The official swearing-in ceremony was held at noon that day. On January 11, DeSantis posthumously pardoned the Groveland Four, four black men falsely convicted of rape in 1949.In January 2019, DeSantis officially suspended Broward County sheriff Scott Israel for his response to the mass shootings at the Fort Lauderdale airport and Marjory Stoneman Douglas High School, appointing Gregory Tony to replace Israel. In his first two weeks in office, DeSantis appointed Barbara Lagoa, Robert J. Luck and Carlos G. Muñiz to fill the three vacancies on the Florida Supreme Court, shifting the court's majority from liberal to conservative. He replaced the entire South Florida Water Management District board and signed a $2.5 billion executive order for water quality and Everglades restoration work. In January 2019, DeSantis signed an executive order calling for the end of Common Core in Florida.

In June 2019, DeSantis signed a measure that would make it harder to launch successful ballot initiatives. Petition-gathering for ballot initiatives to legalize medical cannabis, increases to the minimum wage, and expansion of Medicaid were also under way.

After the 2020 Republican National Convention was pulled from its originally scheduled host city, Charlotte, following conflict between Trump and North Carolina Governor Roy Cooper over plans for a large-scale gathering without public-health protocols in place to prevent spread of COVID-19, DeSantis campaigned to have Florida be the new host state. He competed with similar entreaties from Tennessee and Georgia. DeSantis won, with the main festivities of the RNC, including Trump's keynote speech, relocated to Jacksonville. Ultimately, the entire event was scrapped in favor of rallies online and on television.

On February 2, 2021, DeSantis announced support for legislation to crack down on Big Tech and prevent alleged political censorship. He also announced his support of a number of election law restrictions.

In March 2021, DeSantis proposed legislation to impose restrictions and stricter requirements for Florida universities to collaborate with Chinese academics and universities; he said this would crack down on economic espionage by China. DeSantis signed two such bills in June.

In April 2021, DeSantis signed into law the Combating Public Disorder Act he had been advocating. Aside from being an anti-riot statute, it forbade intimidation by mobs; penalized damage to historic properties or memorials, such as downtown Miami's Christopher Columbus statue, which was damaged in 2020; and forbade publishing personal identifying information online with intent to harm. DeSantis had argued for this legislation by citing the George Floyd protests of 2020 and the 2021 United States Capitol attack, although only the former was mentioned at the signing ceremony. Several months after the signing, a federal judge blocked the portion of the law that introduced a new definition of "riot", calling it too vague.

On May 5, 2021, Desantis announced that all Florida police officers, firefighters, and paramedics would receive a $1,000 bonus.

In May 2021, he signed a deal with The Seminole Tribe of Florida to allow the tribe to offer statewide online sports betting.

In June 2021, DeSantis signed a bill incentivizing wildlife corridors.

In its 2021 session, the Florida legislature passed DeSantis's top priorities. During his tenure, DeSantis had a generally smooth relationship with the Legislature, which enacted many of his proposals.

During 2021, there was speculation that DeSantis would run for president in the 2024 election. On September 7, DeSantis said he thought such speculation was "purely manufactured". During a September 30 appearance on Fox News, he said he would run for reelection as governor in 2022 but was not thinking beyond that. On November 5 he filed to run for reelection as governor, and on November 8 announced that he had done so. In a straw poll conducted at the 2022 Conservative Political Action Conference for the 2024 Republican presidential nomination, DeSantis came in second with 28% of the vote, behind Donald Trump, who received 59%.

On December 2, 2021, DeSantis announced that as part of a $100 million funding proposal for the Florida National Guard, $3.5 million would be allocated to the reactivation of the Florida State Guard, a volunteer state defense force that has been inactive since 1947.

In 2022, DeSantis was increasingly seen as a contender for the 2024 Republican presidential nomination. Various writers predicted that DeSantis could defeat former president Donald Trump or said that DeSantis is preferable to Trump in view of the January 6 hearings and subsequent straw polls. This idea gained more traction after the 2022 United States midterm elections, when DeSantis was reelected governor by almost 20 percentage points over Democratic nominee Charlie Crist, while Trump-endorsed candidates, such as Mehmet Oz in the United States Senate race in Pennsylvania, performed poorly.

In September 2022, after similar actions by Texas Governor Greg Abbott, an agent of DeSantis recruited 50 newly arrived asylum seekers, mostly from Venezuela, in San Antonio, Texas, and flew them via two chartered planes to the Crestview, Florida airport, where they did not debark, then proceeded to Martha's Vineyard, Massachusetts. Attorneys representing the immigrants claimed the refugees were lied to, promised jobs, funds, English lessons, legal services and housing assistance at their destination. The Florida legislature had appropriated $12 million to transport migrants out of the state, funding under the purview of attorney Larry Keefe, DeSantis's public safety czar, who was in charge of immigrant affairs and had a prior relationship with the air carrier. Vertol was paid $615,000 on September 8 for the transport, and received another $980,000 less than two weeks later. The destination community was not notified of the refugees' impending arrival and requirements. The migrants filed a class-action suit against DeSantis, calling his treatment of them "extreme and outrageous, and utterly intolerable in a civilized community." DeSantis's spokesperson noted that the refugees had all signed a consent form, and called the lawsuit "political theater" by "opportunistic activists" at the expense of "illegal immigrants".

COVID-19 pandemic 

During 2020 and 2021, scientists and media outlets gave mixed reviews of DeSantis's handling of the COVID-19 pandemic. He lifted restrictions earlier than most other state governors, but implemented measures to protect the elderly. DeSantis managed to avoid the dire consequences many predicted, Florida's death rate was near the national average, and the state's economy fared better than others. By 2023, many political scientists acknowledged that DeSantis's management of the pandemic may have benefited him in his reelection campaign, and he was credited with turning "his coronavirus policies into a parable of American freedom".

2020
By March 11, 2020, the Centers for Disease Control (CDC) concluded that community spread of the pandemic had occurred within Florida. After considering the matter for a few weeks, on April 1 DeSantis issued an executive order to restrict activities within the state to those deemed essential services. By June, he had adopted a more targeted approach, declaring in mid-June: 

We're not shutting down, we're gonna go forward, we're gonna continue to protect the most vulnerable....particularly when you have a virus that disproportionately impacts one segment of society, to suppress a lot of working-age people at this point I don't think would likely be very effective.  

That approach was similar to what a substantial faction of doctors recommended a few months later in the Great Barrington Declaration. DeSantis got vaccinated for COVID-19, and expressed enthusiasm for people getting vaccinated, but has opposed requiring it.

In early June, DeSantis partially lifted his stay-at-home order, lifting restrictions on bars and cinemas; the same day he lifted the restrictions, Florida recorded the largest case surge in six weeks. DeSantis rejected the implementation of a statewide face mask mandate, and let his stay-at-home order implemented in April expire. He announced that he would reinstate some restrictions on business activity in late June to halt the virus's spread, but said Florida is "not going back" on reopening the economy, arguing that "people going to a business is not what's driving" the surge in cases. On September 25, Florida lifted all remaining capacity restrictions on businesses, while also prohibiting local governments from enforcing public health orders with fines, or restricting restaurants to less than 50% capacity. DeSantis urged public health officials in Florida cities to focus less on universal COVID-19 testing and more on testing people experiencing symptoms.   

DeSantis favored reopening schools for in-person learning for the 2020–21 school year. By October, he announced all 67 public school districts were open for in-person learning.

According to the CDC, life expectancy during 2020 dropped in Florida to 77.5 years from 79 years in 2019; that fall of 1.5 years in Florida was less than the nationwide fall of 1.8 years. Both the statewide and nationwide falls in life expectancy were "mostly due to the COVID-19 pandemic and increases in unintentional injuries", with the unintentional deaths mostly attributed to drug overdoses.

2021

By February 2021, DeSantis had generally positive approval ratings, ranging from 51% to 64%. In March 2021, Politico called him the most "politically ascendant" governor in the country, as his controversial policies had been at that point "short of or even the opposite of ruinous", while Florida had "fared no worse, and in some ways better, than many other states". By April 2021, Florida was 27th out of 50 in both cases and deaths per capita. By August 2021, amid a record in new cases within the state, Florida had become the state with the highest per capita hospitalizations for COVID-19.

In February 2021, DeSantis threatened to withhold COVID-19 vaccines from counties that criticized the manner in which vaccines were distributed. The same month, the Biden administration mulled imposing travel restrictions on Florida and other domestic locations to prevent further spread of COVID-19. DeSantis expressed his discontent with what he characterized as "trying to shut FL's border" and announced his intention to fervently oppose it if executed.

On May 3, 2021, DeSantis rescinded the state of emergency and all COVID-19-related public health orders statewide. The same day, he signed a bill into law that prohibited businesses, cruise ships, schools, and government entities from requiring proof of vaccination for use of services.

In July 2021, Florida experienced a record surge in COVID-19 cases, setting a new daily case record on July 30 and accounting for around 1 in 5 new infections in the country. Amid the resurgence, DeSantis banned public schools from implementing mask mandates, claiming without evidence that masks were harmful to children, and in August 2021 he threatened to fine, withhold funding, or withhold salary from any school district or school official who did so. Previously, data released by the Florida Department of Health had tied over 100,000 COVID-19 cases to Florida private and public K-12 schools from September 2020 to April 2021. In late August, the DeSantis administration ordered Alachua and Broward school districts to reverse their mask mandates or face a reduction in state funding, leading the districts' leaders to declare that they would take legal action in response.

In August 2021, President Biden singled out Florida and Texas as "states with low vaccination rates" that "account for one third of all new COVID-19 cases in the entire country". Biden added, "if some governors aren’t willing to do the right thing to beat this pandemic, then they should allow businesses and universities who want to do the right thing to be able to do it." DeSantis responded, "We will not allow Joe Biden and his bureaucratic flunkies to come in and commandeer the rights and freedoms of Floridians." He also said, "No elected official is doing more to enable the transmission of COVID in America than Joe Biden with his open borders policies." The Washington Post reported that this claim was based on "guesswork and assumptions, not evidence", while PolitiFact reported that COVID-19 hot spots tend to be clustered far from the border, in places with low rates of public vaccination, not along the southern border, as would be expected if migrants were driving the surge in cases. Moreover, the U.S. does not have an open borders policy, as most migrants at the southern border are prevented from entering the country by Title 42.

On August 27, 2021, Judge John Cooper ruled that DeSantis could not ban mask mandates in schools. The state appealed, automatically suspending Cooper's ruling while the appeal was considered, but Cooper overruled that suspension on September 8, lifting DeSantis's ban, citing the need to protect unvaccinated children. On December 22, 2021, the case was dismissed as moot, and the trial court's order was vacated.

DeSantis has heavily promoted monoclonal antibody treatment for COVID-19, which can treat people after they get sick and reduce hospitalization. One such medication is made by Regeneron, which is a major investment of DeSantis's largest political donor. At a September press conference, DeSantis said that local governments will face a $5,000 fine for imposing vaccine mandates. He said government agency vaccine mandates violate the state's law banning private businesses from requiring vaccine passports for customers. At the event, a number of speakers spoke out against the vaccine and vaccine mandates, including one person who falsely claimed the vaccine "changes your RNA".

On September 21, 2021, DeSantis appointed Joseph Ladapo, a vocal supporter of his COVID-19 policies, as Florida's surgeon general. Ladapo has a history of promoting unproven treatments against COVID-19, opposes COVID-19 vaccine requirements, has questioned the safety of COVID-19 vaccines, and has associated with America's Frontline Doctors, a pro-Trump healthcare group known for promoting falsehoods about the pandemic.

In October 2021, DeSantis offered to pay police officers $5,000 to relocate to and work in Florida, making a specific appeal to officers who refused to comply with vaccine requirements.

On November 18, 2021, DeSantis signed a legislative package into law, officially making Florida the first state to impose fines on businesses and hospitals that require inoculation against COVID-19 without exemptions or alternatives. The legislation was signed a day after Florida Republican lawmakers passed his anti-mandate agenda. DeSantis called it "the strongest piece of legislation that's been enacted anywhere in the country" in opposition to COVID-19 vaccination mandates.

2022 and 2023
In May 2022, a Bloomberg News op-ed claimed that, when adjusting state death tolls based on what they would be if age distribution were equal between the states, Florida's COVID-19 death toll would be less than the national average and only slightly more than California's. The op-ed also found that young people have been far more likely to die from COVID-19 in Florida than California, probably because children were in physical schools in Florida during the 2020-21 school year.

In June 2022, DeSantis decided against ordering COVID-19 vaccines for children under 5, making Florida the only state not to preorder vaccines for that demographic.

In January 2023, DeSantis announced a proposal to permanently ban COVID-19 mandates in Florida. The proposal includes a permanent ban of mask requirements throughout the state, vaccine and mask requirements in schools, COVID-19 passports in the state, and employers hiring or firing based on COVID-19 vaccines.

Hurricane Ian 

In September 2022, DeSantis declared a state of emergency for the entire state of Florida as Ian approached. He also asked for federal aid ahead of time. On October 5, after Ian deserted Florida, President Joe Biden arrived in Florida and met with DeSantis and Senators Marco Rubio and Rick Scott. DeSantis and Biden held a press conference in Fort Myers to report on the status of the cleanup. In addition, DeSantis partnered with Elon Musk, CEO of SpaceX and Tesla, Inc., to use the Starlink satellite Internet service to help restore communication across the state.

First lady Casey DeSantis partnered with State Disaster Recovery Mental Health Coordinator Sara Newhouse and the Department of Health and Department of Children and Families to deploy free mental health resources to communities Ian affected.

Political positions

Abortion 
Following the U.S. Supreme Court's Dobbs decision, DeSantis pledged to "expand pro-life protections". On April 14, 2022, he signed into law a bill that regulates elective abortions after 15 weeks of pregnancy; under the previous law, the limit had been 24 weeks. The law includes exceptions permitting termination of a viable pregnancy beyond 15 weeks if at least two physicians certify that it is necessary to avert a "serious risk" to the pregnant woman's physical health or that the fetus has a "fatal fetal abnormality", but does not make exceptions for rape, human trafficking, incest, or mental health.

The statute prohibits partial birth abortion, experimentation on fetuses, and harming infants born alive during or immediately after an attempted abortion. It also enforces previously enacted minimum health and safety standards for third-trimester abortion and standards for humane and sanitary disposal of fetal remains that had not been enforced due to U.S. Supreme Court decisions. Abortion providers found in violation of the statute's provisions can be charged with up to a third-degree felony. The provisions generally apply only to physicians who perform abortions, but any health care employee of an abortion provider can be charged with a felony for failure to report violations.

The law was expected to go into effect on July 1, but a state judge blocked its enforcement, ruling that the Florida Constitution guarantees a right to privacy that renders the law unconstitutional. After DeSantis appealed the ruling, the law went into effect on July 5, pending judicial review. Floridians anticipated a state Supreme Court decision on the law's validity. Before the Dobbs decision upheld the Mississippi law that inspired Florida's, the Supreme Court of Florida had cited the privacy argument to invalidate a similar state law. Although Dobbs overruled Roe v. Wade's holding that privacy rights secured a federal right to abortion until viability, that decision concerned the scope of an unenumerated right held to be implicit in the U.S. Constitution's broader guarantees of liberty or due process.

Economy 
DeSantis has said that the debate over how to reduce the federal deficit should shift emphasis from tax increases to curtailing spending and triggering economic growth. He supports a "no budget no pay" policy for Congress to encourage the passage of a budget. He believes the Federal Reserve System should be audited.

In the wake of the alleged IRS targeting controversy, DeSantis called for IRS commissioner John Koskinen's resignation for having "failed the American people by frustrating Congress's attempts to ascertain the truth". He co-sponsored a bill to impeach Koskinen for violating the public's trust. Citizens Against Government Waste, a conservative think tank, named DeSantis a "Taxpayer Superhero" in 2015.

He supported the Regulations from the Executive in Need of Scrutiny (REINS) Act, which would require that regulations that have a significant economic impact be subject to a vote of Congress prior to taking effect.

DeSantis introduced the Let Seniors Work Act, which would repeal the Retirement Earnings Test and exempt senior citizens from the 12.4% Social Security payroll tax, and co-sponsored a measure to eliminate taxes on Social Security benefits.

He sponsored the Transportation Empowerment Act, which would transfer much of the responsibility for transportation projects to the states and sharply reduce the federal gas tax.

DeSantis has opposed legislation to require online retailers to collect and pay state sales tax.

He voted for the Tax Cuts and Jobs Act of 2017. He said the bill would bring a "dramatically lower tax rate", "full expensing of capital investments", and more jobs to America.

As a result of a significant increase in gasoline prices, DeSantis would announce on November 22, 2021, that he would be temporarily waiving the state's gasoline tax in the next legislative session in 2022.

Education 

DeSantis introduced the Higher Education Reform and Opportunity Act, which would allow states to create their own accreditation systems, in 2016. In an op-ed for National Review, he said his legislation would give students "access to federal loan money to put towards non-traditional educational opportunities, such as online learning courses, vocational schools, and apprenticeships in skilled trades".

In June 2021, DeSantis led an effort to ban the teaching of critical race theory in Florida public schools (though it had not been a part of Florida public school curriculum). He described critical race theory as "teaching kids to hate their country", mirroring a similar push by conservatives nationally. The Florida Board of Education approved the ban on June 10. The Florida Education Association criticized the ban, accusing the Board of trying to hide facts from students. Other critics claimed the ban was an effort to "politicize classroom education and whitewash American history".

On December 15, 2021, DeSantis announced a new bill, the Stop Wrongs to Our Kids and Employees (WOKE) Act, which would allow parents to sue school districts that teach their children critical race theory. The bill is designed to combat "woke indoctrination" in Florida businesses and schools by preventing instruction that could make some people feel that they bear "personal responsibility" for historic wrongdoings because of their race, gender or national origin, preventing instruction that teaches that individuals are "inherently racist, sexist, or oppressive, whether consciously or unconsciously.", and preventing instruction that teaches that groups of people are oppressed or privileged based on their race, gender or national origin. He said of the bill: "No taxpayer dollars should be used to teach our kids to hate our country or hate each other." On August 18, 2022, a Florida judge blocked the act, saying that it violates the First Amendment and is too vague.

On September 14, 2021, DeSantis announced that Florida would replace the Florida Standards Assessment (FSA) test with a system of smaller tests scattered throughout the year. He said there would be three tests, in the fall, winter and spring, each smaller than the FSA. Florida Commissioner of Education Richard Corcoran agreed with the decision, calling it a "huge victory for the school system". The new system is to be implemented by the 2022–23 school year.

Environment 

DeSantis has called himself a "Teddy Roosevelt conservationist". During his 2018 gubernatorial run, he said that he did not deny climate change's existence, but did not want to be labeled a "climate change believer", adding, "I think we contribute to changes in the environment, but I'm not in the pews of the global warming left."

DeSantis signed an executive order in 2019 that included a variety of components relating to the environment. These included a promise to spend $2.5 billion over four years on restoring the Everglades and "other water protection", and the creation of a Blue-Green Algae Task Force, an Office of Environmental Accountability and Transparency, and a Chief Science Officer.

DeSantis supports banning hydraulic fracturing. On July 10, 2020, he announced that Florida would spend $8.6 million out of $166 million received by the state from a legal settlement between Volkswagen and the United States Department of Justice relating to emission violations to add 34 charging stations for electric cars. The stations would be along Interstates 4, 75, 95, 275 and 295. On June 16, 2021, DeSantis signed into law House Bill 839, which bans local governments in Florida from requiring gas stations to add electric car charging stations.

On June 21, 2021, DeSantis signed into law House Bill 919, which prohibits local governments from placing bans or restrictions on any source of electricity. Several sizable cities in Florida at that time (Orlando, St. Petersburg, Tallahassee, Dunedin, Largo, Satellite Beach, Gainesville, Sarasota, Safety Harbor and Miami Beach) were setting goals to get all their energy from renewable sources. The bill was described as similar to those in other states (Texas, Tennessee, Louisiana, Arizona and Oklahoma) that passed laws preventing cities from banning natural gas hookups.

Gun law 
DeSantis opposes gun control. He received an A+ rating from the National Rifle Association. He generally opposes firearm regulation, saying, "Very rarely do firearms restrictions affect criminals. They really only affect law-abiding citizens."

After the 2018 Stoneman Douglas High School shooting in Parkland, Florida, DeSantis expressed his support for hiring retired law enforcement officers and military veterans as armed guards for schools. He disagreed with legislation Governor Rick Scott signed that banned bump stocks, added a mandatory three-day waiting period for gun purchases, and raised the legal age for purchases from 18 to 21. He has expressed support for measures to improve federal background checks for purchasing firearms and has said that there is a need to intervene with those who are exhibiting warning signs of committing violence instead of waiting until a crime has been committed.

In November 2020, DeSantis proposed an "anti-mob" extension to the preexisting stand-your-ground law in Florida that would allow gun-owning residents to use deadly force on individuals they believe are looting. It would also make blocking traffic during a protest a third-degree felony and impose criminal penalties for partaking in "violent or disorderly assemblies".

Immigration 
DeSantis was a critic of Obama's immigration policies; he opposed Deferred Action for Childhood Arrivals (DACA) and Deferred Action for Parents of Americans (DAPA) and accused him of failing to enforce immigration laws. DeSantis has sought to ban "sanctuary cities". He co-sponsored the Establishing Mandatory Minimums for Illegal Reentry Act of 2015, also known as Kate's Law, which would amend the Immigration and Nationality Act to increase penalties applicable to aliens who unlawfully reenter the U.S. after being removed. DeSantis encouraged Florida sheriffs to cooperate with the federal government on immigration-related issues. In June 2019, he signed an anti-"sanctuary city" bill into law. Florida had no sanctuary cities before the law's enactment, and immigration advocates called the bill politically motivated.

DeSantis's administration allocated $12 million for relocating migrants to other states.

Law enforcement 

DeSantis opposes efforts to defund the police, and as governor has introduced initiatives to "fund the police". In September 2021, DeSantis introduced a $5,000 signing bonus for Florida police officers in a bid to attract additional out-of-state police recruits.

LGBT rights 
DeSantis has a "0" rating from the Human Rights Campaign for his voting record on LGBT-related issues and legislation. In 2018, he told the Sun-Sentinel that he "doesn't want any discrimination in Florida, I want people to be able to live their life, whether you're gay or whether you're religious."

On June 1, 2021, DeSantis signed the Fairness in Women's Sports Act (SB 1028). It bans transgender girls and women from participating and competing in middle-school and high-school girls' and college women's sports competitions in Florida. The law took effect on July 1.

In February 2022, DeSantis voiced his support for the Florida Parental Rights in Education Act, often denigrated as the "Don't Say Gay" law by its opponents, which would prohibit instruction on sexual orientation or gender identity in school classrooms from kindergarten to grade 3. He said it was "entirely inappropriate" for teachers and school administrators to talk to students about their gender identity. DeSantis signed this bill (House Bill 1557) into law on March 28, 2022, and it took effect on July 1. This statute also includes a provision "requiring school district personnel to encourage a student to discuss issues relating to his or her well-being with his or her parent or to facilitate discussion of the issue with the parent", which applies not just to gender issues and sexuality but also to other challenging subjects, including substance abuse and/or depression.

Technology companies 
In response to social media networks removing Trump from their platforms, DeSantis and other Florida Republicans pushed legislation in the Florida legislature to prohibit technology companies from de-platforming political candidates. A federal judge blocked the law by preliminary injunction the day before it was to take effect, on the grounds that it violated the First Amendment and federal law. When Twitter suspended DeSantis administration critic Rebekah Jones' account for violating rules against spam and platform manipulation, DeSantis's office applauded the decision, calling it "long overdue".

Term limits and pensions 
DeSantis opted not to receive his congressional pension, and filed a measure that would eliminate pensions for members of Congress. After introducing the End Pensions in Congress Act, DeSantis said, "The Founding Fathers envisioned elected officials as part of a servant class, yet Washington has evolved into a ruling class culture."

DeSantis supports a constitutional amendment to impose term limits on members of Congress, so that U.S. representatives would be limited to three terms and senators to two. As of 2022, he has served three terms as a U.S. representative.

Voting rights 
DeSantis expressed support for the Voting Rights Restoration for Felons Initiative after it passed in November 2018, saying that he was "obligated to faithfully implement [it] as it is defined" when he became governor. After he refused to restore the voting rights for felons with unpaid fines, which voting rights groups said was inconsistent with the results of the referendum, he was challenged in court. The Florida Supreme Court sided with DeSantis on the issue, and the U.S. Court of Appeals for the Eleventh Circuit also sided with DeSantis in a 6–4 ruling.

In April 2019, DeSantis directed Florida's elections chief to expand the availability of Spanish-language ballots and Spanish assistance for voters. In a statement, DeSantis said "It is critically important that Spanish-speaking Floridians are able to exercise their right to vote without any language barriers."

DeSantis instructed Florida Attorney General Ashley Moody to investigate allegations of voter fraud perpetrated by former New York City Mayor Michael Bloomberg after he announced a $16 million investment to pay off the financial obligations for felons so they may vote ahead of the 2020 presidential election in Florida. The allegations asserted Bloomberg had broken the law by offering incentives to vote.

After the 2020 U.S. elections, DeSantis and other Republicans proposed changes to Florida election laws. DeSantis called for eliminating ballot drop boxes, as well as limiting voting by mail by requiring that voters re-register every year to vote by mail and requiring that signatures on mail-in ballots "must match the most recent signature on file" (rather than any of the voter's signatures in the Florida system). The changes to mail-in voting were notable given that Republicans had historically voted by mail more than Democrats, but Democrats outvoted Republicans by mail in 2020. According to a Tampa Bay Times analysis, DeSantis's signature match proposal could have led to rejections of his own mail-in ballots due to changes in his signature history over time; voting rights experts argued that the signature matching proposal could be used to disenfranchise voters whose signatures varied over time.

Personal life

DeSantis is a Roman Catholic. DeSantis met his wife, Casey Black, on a golf course at the University of North Florida. A former television host for the Golf Channel and WJXT, she married DeSantis on September 26, 2009, at Walt Disney World. The couple lived in Ponte Vedra Beach, near St. Augustine, until it was drawn into the neighboring 4th district. They then moved to Palm Coast, north of Daytona Beach. They have three children. He is a member of the Veterans of Foreign Wars and the American Legion.

DeSantis played on the field the day of the 2017 congressional baseball shooting. While not present at the time it occurred, he and fellow Representative Jeff Duncan reportedly met the perpetrator beforehand and were asked by him whether Republicans or Democrats were playing that day.

Electoral history

Publications 

 DeSantis, Ron (2011). Dreams from Our Founding Fathers: First Principles in the Age of Obama. Jacksonville: High-Pitched Hum Publishing. .
 DeSantis, Ron (2023). The Courage to Be Free. Broadside Books. .

References

External links 

 Official Florida Governor website
 Campaign website
 
 
 
 

|-

|-

|-

|-

|-

 
1978 births
21st-century American politicians
21st-century American writers
American anti-communists
American military lawyers
American people of Italian descent
American prosecutors
American Roman Catholics
Catholics from Florida
Dunedin High School alumni
Florida lawyers
Republican Party governors of Florida
Harvard Law School alumni
United States Navy Judge Advocate General's Corps
Living people
Military personnel from Florida
People from Dunedin, Florida
Politicians from Jacksonville, Florida
Republican Party members of the United States House of Representatives from Florida
Right-wing populism in the United States
United States Navy officers
United States Navy personnel of the Iraq War
United States Navy reservists
Yale Bulldogs baseball players
Yale University alumni